Merovingian may refer to:

 Merovingian dynasty, family of Frankish kings who ruled an area of modern France and Germany from the 5th to 8th century AD
 Merovingian art and architecture
 Merovingian script
 Merovingian (The Matrix), a character in the films The Matrix Reloaded and The Matrix Revolutions
 Merovingian Music, a non-genre specific record label based out of Red Bank, New Jersey